The Parliamentary Secretary to the Treasury is the official title of the most senior whip of the governing party in the Parliament of the United Kingdom. Today, any official links between the Treasury and this office are nominal and the title of the office can be seen as a sinecure that allows the incumbent to draw a Government salary, attend Cabinet, and use a Downing Street residence, traditionally 12 Downing Street.

The position is currently hold by Simon Hart from October 2022.

History
The position of Secretary to the Treasury was created in 1660. Until 1711, there was only one Secretary to the Treasury; however, in that year, a second position was created to help deal with the increasing workload. This new position was known as the junior secretary to the Treasury, and the existing post as the senior secretary to the Treasury. Initially, when the position of Senior Secretary to the Treasury became vacant (except as the result of an election causing a change of government), the junior secretary was usually automatically promoted to the senior role. Over time, however, the roles of the Senior and Junior Secretaries began to diverge, the Senior Secretary post being used as a sinecure post for the chief whip, with no formal responsibilities to the Treasury. The junior secretary post remained a substantive position working in the Treasury. As such, the senior secretary became known as the parliamentary secretary to the Treasury while the junior secretary became known as Financial Secretary to the Treasury, and the 'automatic' promotion from Junior to Senior ceased. While the exact date on which this change occurred is disputed, it is agreed that the distinction was complete by 1830. In the mid-nineteenth century, the parliamentary secretary to the Treasury was referred to as the patronage secretary to the Treasury.

Parliamentary Secretaries to the Treasury, 1830–present

19th century
Edward Ellice 1830–1832
Charles Wood 1832–1834
Sir George Clerk, Bt 1834–1835
Hon. Edward Stanley 1835–1841
Denis Le Marchant 1841
Sir Thomas Fremantle, Baronet 1841–1844
John Young 1844–1846
Henry Tufnell 1846–1850
William Goodenough Hayter 1850–1852
William Forbes Mackenzie 1852
William Goodenough Hayter 1853–1858
Sir William Jolliffe, Baronet 1858–1859
Henry Brand 1859–1866

Thomas Edward Taylor 1866–1868
Gerard Noel 1868
George Glyn 1868–1873
Arthur Wellesley Peel 1873–1874
Sir William Hart Dyke, Bt 1874–1880
Lord Richard Grosvenor 1880–1885
Aretas Akers-Douglas 1885–1886
Arnold Morley 1886
Aretas Akers-Douglas 1886–1892
Edward Marjoribanks 1892–1894
Thomas Edward Ellis 1894–1895
Sir William Walrond, Baronet 1895–1902

20th century
Sir Alexander Acland-Hood, Baronet 1902–1905
George Whiteley 1905–1908
Jack Pease 1908–1910
Master of Elibank 1910–1912
Percy Holden Illingworth 1912–1915
John William Gulland 1915
Lord Edmund Talbot 1915–1916 (Conservative, jointly)
John William Gulland 1915–1916 (Liberal, jointly)
Lord Edmund Talbot 1916–1921 (Conservative, jointly)
Neil Primrose 1916–1917 (Liberal, jointly)
Frederick Guest 1917–1921 (Liberal, jointly)
Leslie Orme Wilson 1921–1922 (Conservative, jointly)
Charles McCurdy 1921–1922 (Liberal, jointly)
Leslie Orme Wilson 1922–1923
Bolton Eyres-Monsell 1923–1924
Ben Spoor 1924
Bolton Eyres-Monsell 1924–1929
Tom Kennedy 1929–1931
David Margesson 1931–1940
Sir Charles Edwards 1940–1942 (Labour, jointly)
James Gray Stuart 1941–1945 (Conservative, jointly)
William Whiteley 1942–1951 (Labour, jointly until 1945)
Patrick Buchan-Hepburn 1951–1955
Edward Heath 1955–1959
Martin Redmayne 1959–1964
Ted Short 1964–1966
John Silkin 1966–1969
Bob Mellish 1969–1970
Francis Pym 1970–1973
Humphrey Atkins 1973–1974
Bob Mellish 1974–1976
Michael Cocks 1976–1979
Michael Jopling 1979–1983
John Wakeham 1983–1987
David Waddington 1987–1989
Tim Renton 1989–1990
Richard Ryder 1990–1995
Alastair Goodlad 1995–1997
Nick Brown 1997–1998
Ann Taylor 1998–2001

21st century
Hilary Armstrong 2001–2006
Jacqui Smith 2006–2007
Geoff Hoon 2007–2008
Nick Brown 2008–2010
Patrick McLoughlin 2010–2012
Andrew Mitchell 2012
Sir George Young, Bt. CH 2012–2014
Michael Gove 2014–2015
Mark Harper 2015–2016
Gavin Williamson 2016–2017
Julian Smith 2017–2019
Mark Spencer 2019–2022
Chris Heaton-Harris 2022
Wendy Morton 2022
Simon Hart 2022–present

References

Lists of government ministers of the United Kingdom
Ministerial offices in the United Kingdom
1830 establishments in the United Kingdom